Podocarpus laubenfelsii is a species of conifer in the family Podocarpaceae. It is native to Borneo.

This plant grows in four known locations and there are few mature trees in any subpopulation. It grows alongside Agathis borneensis, Nageia wallichiana, Sundacarpus amarus, Dacrydium gracile, and Falcatifolium falciforme in forested habitat.

This tree can grow quite large and is harvested for its valuable wood.

References

laubenfelsii
Endangered plants
Endemic flora of Borneo
Flora of the Borneo montane rain forests
Plants described in 1984
Taxonomy articles created by Polbot